Aethes cnicana is a moth of the family Tortricidae. It was described by Westwood in 1854. It is found in Europe, China (Beijing, Heilongjiang, Inner Mongolia, Jilin, Liaoning, Tianjin), Japan, Korea and Russia.

Very similar to Ancylis badiana but differs as follows: forewings with markings bright ferruginous-brown, antemedian fascia less angulated, less distinctly interrupted, not dilated on dorsum. Julius von Kennel provides a full description.

The moth flies from May to July and are often attracted to light.

The larvae feed on Cirsium.

References

External links

Aethes cnicana at UKmoths
Lepidoptera of Belgium
Lepiforum.de

cnicana
Moths of Asia
Moths described in 1854
Taxa named by John O. Westwood
Tortricidae of Europe